During World War II civilian flying schools, under government contract, provided a considerable part of the flying training effort undertaken by the United States Army Air Forces.

History
With the consolidation of pilot training by the United States Army Air Corps in 1931, nearly all flying training had taken place at Randolph Field, near San Antonio, Texas.   During the 1930s, Randolph had produced about 500 new pilots per year, which was adequate for the peacetime air corps.  With war clouds gathering in Europe, especially after the 1938 Munich Agreement, General Henry H. Arnold, the Chief of Staff of the Air Corps, realized that the Army was going to have to increase the number of its pilots in case of a general war breaking out again.   As a result, Arnold and his command staff developed a plan to supplement the training at Randolph with military pilot training conducted by the civil flight schools in the United States.

Prewar years
In late 1938, eleven flight schools were contacted by the United States Army Air Corps by Arnold without any funding or Congressional Authorization.   Arnold asked if they would, at their own expense, set up facilities to house, feed and train Army pilots.   He promised that the Army would pay the schools $1,170 for each pilot that completed a primary flight training course, and $18 per flight hour for each student that washed out.   Arnold received a commitment from eight flying schools, accepting his proposal.

In April 1939, Congress authorized $300 million for the Air Corps to procure and maintain 6,000 aircraft.  In the authorization, the Air Corps was authorized to enroll Army Flight Cadets in civilian training schools.   Moving forward, in June 1939, the War Department approved Arnold's request to organize nine civilian flight schools to train Army pilots.  Flight training would begin at most of these schools in July 1939.  After the spring offensive by Nazi Germany and the Fall of France in May, 1940, the Army, Arnold increased the rate of pilot training from 4,500 to 7,000 pilots per year.    Each of the nine Contract Pilot Schools (CPS) were requested to open an additional school to accommodate this increase.    In August 1940, the rate of pilot training was ordered increased to 12,000 per year.

All civil flying instructors had to be certified by the CAA, as well as the ground school instructors and aircraft mechanics.  Also flying instructors had to undergo a two-week Army refresher program.  In order to exempt the instructors and mechanics from the wartime draft, all were enlisted into the Army as privates in the Army Reserve.   Each CPS was commanded by an Army officer (mostly, but not all West Point graduates), who supervised all aspects of the program as well as insuring that military discipline was maintained.  Also, a few Air Corps pilots conducted all check rides.

However, the existing CPS contractors were unable to expand to train this increased number.  In response, the Air Corps issued a request for bid (RFB) to all of the 38 Civil Aeronautics Administration (CAA) approved flying schools in the country outlining the specifications for Army pilot training.   From the schools responding to the RFB, the Air Corps selected eleven new contractors for Army primary flight training.  With the war in Europe expanding, and the threat of war with the Japanese Empire becoming more and more a possibility,  the Chief of Staff of the Army directed Arnold to increase pilot training to 30,000 per year. To meet this new rate, the CPS concept was again expanded by converting three of the Level 1 primary CPS schools to Level 2 basic flying training and expanded the number of CPS contractors.

However, in the strictest sense, these schools were not owned or leased by the USAAF, and for the most part, they were not designated or activated as Army Air Fields.  In official Army  directories, they were listed by the name of the civilian flying school, the name of the airport on which it operated, or sometimes just by the city name.

In addition to the Air Corps demands for civil flying schools to train military pilots, in late 1940, President Franklin Roosevelt accepted a proposal from British Prime Minister Winston Churchill that the United States train Royal Air Force (RAF) pilots at civilian flying schools.  The first RAF flight cadets began training in the United States in June 1941. The Army Air Corps (later Army Air Forces) maintained a small liaison detachment at each of these schools, however the RAF provided a cadre of officers for military supervision and training, while flight training was conducted by contract flying schools.

World War II

Primary Flight Training
After the Japanese attack on Pearl Harbor and both Fascist Italy and Nazi Germany's declaration of war against the United States in December 1941, plans were made by the Army to increase the training rate to 50,000, then 70,000 and finally 102,000 pilots per year.  The Defense Plant Corporation (DFC) purchased all of the CFS's and leased the facilities back to the civilian contractors.  This effectively made them government property, although they continued to be operated by the civilian contractors.  The DFC then funded the construction of all future CPSs. 

The CFS's were assigned to the various Flying Training Commands, and each had a designated USAAF Flying Training Detachment assigned for supervision and liaison with the command.  According to the contract, the government supplied students with training aircraft, flying clothes, textbooks, and equipment. Schools furnished instructors, training sites and facilities, aircraft maintenance, quarters, and mess halls.  To the flying cadets, the CPSs were just another training assignment—although the flight instructors were civilian contractors, the cadets still experienced the discipline and drudgery of military life.

Due to the wartime pressure to produce pilots rapidly the AAF paid scant attention to their military training. The atmosphere of the civilian-operated primary schools was not conducive to the development of rigid discipline, and too little time was available for military instruction at all the stages of pilot training. What instruction there was, over and above the regimen of Army life, was restricted largely to marching, ceremonies, inspections, and military customs and courtesies. The vigorous physical conditioning, however, continued and intensified during flying training.

Trainers used were primarily Fairchild PT-19s, PT-17 Stearmans and Ryan PT-22s, although a wide variety of other types could be found at the airfields.   The primary training syllabus  was initially twelve weeks in length including 60 hours of flight time and 225 hours of ground training.  However this was changed by the Army as the situation required. Although the number of flight hours remained at 60 throughout the war, the demands of the increasing pilot training rate resulted in the primary training to be reduced to ten weeks in 1940, then reduced to nine weeks in 1942.

The instruction given at the CPSs was an adaptation of the primary phase formerly taught at Randolph Field.  Each student in primary was required to make at least 175 landings.  As given at the height of the effort, primary flying training was divided into four standard phases. In the pre-solo phase students became familiar with the general operation of a light aircraft.  In the second, or intermediate phase, pre-solo work was reviewed, and precision of control was developed.  The third, or accuracy, phase demanded high proficiency in various types of landing approaches and landings, and the fourth, or acrobatic, phase required ability to perform loops, Immelmann turns, slow rolls, half-rolls, and snap rolls. In 1944, after the training demand had peaked, the course length was increased back to ten weeks.

The Army Air Forces never reached the 102,000 pilot training rate.  This was reduced to a more realistic rate of 93,600 in June 1943.  The peak of AAF flying training was reached in November 1943 when the CPSs graduated 11,411 cadets.   After that AAF flight training began a gradual reduction that resulted in the closing of most of the CPSs in the fall of 1944.   Ten CPSs remained in operation in 1945, which were closed at the end of World War II and the Army Air Forces returned to in-house primary pilot training.

Glider Pilot Training
A subset of the CFS's were Glider Training Schools.  Their mission was to train unpowered glider pilots; not powered aircraft pilots.  Military Gliders were a new development that began in the 1920s when after the Treaty of Versailes, the German Air Force was disbanded.  However, the treaty did not prohibit Germany from having sport gliding clubs, and by the late 1920s, many glider flying clubs had been established throughout the country.  When the Nazi Party took over Germany in the early 1930s, the young men in the glider clubs formed the core of the new Luftwaffe.  German DFS-230 combat gliders were used in the invasion of Belgium in May 1940 when they landed on top of the Eben Emael Fort and captured it.   They were also used in the invasion of Crete.   These actions led to the British and later American interest in Combat Gliders and their integration into their armed forces.

In 1941 the Air Corps directed Flying Training Command to establish a glider training program, however given the Army's inexperience, it was decided to utilize civilian glider and soaring schools in a similar manner to the primary powered flight program.    Many glider pilots were already qualified and skilled powered aircraft pilots who had earned their CAA (Civil Aeronautic Administration) civilian pilot's license before war broke out. Other trainees for the glider pilot program had already gone through flight training but had been disqualified, not for lack of skill, but for problems beyond their control such as slightly deficient eyesight.

The main operation got under way at Twenty Nine Palms Army Airfield, in the California desert, where thermal conditions were great for soaring flights.   A facility, named Condor Field, was utilized with C-47 Skytrains flown by Women Airforce Service Pilots (WASP)s being used as tow tugs for the gliders, with Laister-Kauffman TG-4A sailplanes used for glider training.

However, it was learned that the military gliders under development were fundamentally different in their flight characteristics than sailplanes in their handling, and especially the fact that once released, a military glider did not soar as a sailplane does.  The combat gliders under development could not soar and
gain altitude once the pilot released the tow line as a sailplane could.  They could only descend, and once a pilot committed to a landing and discovered, as he got closer, that the landing zone was under fire, mined, or otherwise obstructed, he had little room to maneuver to make a safe landing.

As a result, the TG-4A sailplanes were replaced by Aeronca TG-5As, Taylorcraft TG-6As, and Piper TG-8As unpowered glider conversions of powered light observation aircraft which had similar characteristics to the military gliders under development.  As part of the training program, cadets learned to perform maintenance and, in an emergency, to rebuild wrecked gliders. This was a relatively simple operation, considering that the primary glider consisted of little more than a shell, equipped with radio, wheels, and brakes.

The schools at Twentynine Palms, CA, Mobile, AL, Wickenburg, AZ, and Lamesa, AZ, were the first Glider Training Schools to open.  Once the Glider Pilot Cadet successfully completed their primary training, they moved on to advanced training, taught by AAF instructors at several military glider schools using the CG-4A Waco and British Airspeed Horsas that the pilots would eventually fly into combat during several operations primarily in the European Theater.

Once in operational Troop Carrier squadrons, the gliders and their pilots were initially established as separate flights in the squadron organization.     However, in late 1943, it was decided that having a separate glider force within the Troop Carrier squadrons, it was decided to end the separate glider instruction program and integrate the glider flying and maintenance training program into the Troop Carrier training program.  The contract Glider Schools were subsequently closed or converted into Primary Flight Schools and all glider training was conducted by military glider pilot instructors at schools at Army Air Bases.

Closure
During the course of the war, the schools graduated approximately 250,000 student pilots.  All of the CFS's were inactivated by the end of the war, and were either turned over to the War Assets Administration (WAA) for disposal, or sold back to their previous private owners.   Most today are small general aviation airports; some are major municipal airports, and some were abandoned with little or no evidence of their existence.

List of Contract Flying Schools

Eastern Flying Training Command
29th Flying Training Wing

 Albany Army Airfield, Albany Georgia
 52d  Flying Training Detachment
 Operated by: Darr Aero-Tech Primary Flying School
 Augustine Field, Madison, Mississippi
 62d Flying Training Detachment
 Operated by: Mississippi Institute of Aeronautics
 Avon Park Army Airfield, Avon Park, Florida
 61st Flying Training Detachment
 Operated by: Lodwick Aviation Military Academy
 Carlstrom Field, Arcadia, Florida
 53d Flying Training Detachment
 2148th Army Air Forces Base Unit (Contract Pilot School, Primary), April 1944
 Operated by: Embry-Riddle Company
 Chester Field, McBride, Missouri
 74th Flying Training Detachment
 Operated by: Anderson Air Activities
 Decatur Airport, Decatur, Alabama
 65th Flying Training Detachment
 Operated by: Southern Regional Airways, Inc
 63rd Army Air Forces Contract Pilot School, Douglas, Georgia
 63d Flying Training Detachment
 Operated by: South Georgia College
 Dorr Field, Arcadia, Florida
 54th Flying Training Detachment
 Operated by: Embry-Riddle Company
 Fletcher Field, Clarksdale, Mississippi
 69th Flying Training Detachment
 Operated by: Clarksdale School of Aviation
 Harrell Field, Camden, Arkansas
 59th Flying Training Detachment
 Operated by: Wiggings-Marden Aero Corp
 Harris Army Airfield, Cape Giardeau, Missouri
 73d Flying Training Detachment
 Operated by: Cape Institute of Aeronautics, Inc
 Hawthorne School of Aeronautics, Orangeburg, South Carolina
 58th Flying Training Detachment
 2162d Army Air Forces Base Unit (Contract Pilot School, Primary), April 1944
 Hawthorne School of Aeronautics

 Lodwick Field, Lakeland, Florida
 61st Flying Training Detachment
 2160th Army Air Forces Base Unit (Contract Pilot School, Primary), April 1944
 Operated by: Lodwick School of Aeronautics
 Lafayette Airport, Lafayette, Louisiana
 70th Flying Training Detachment
 Lafayette School of Aeronautics
 McKellar Field, Jackson, Tennessee
 68th Flying Training Detachment
 Operated by: Georgia Air Services, Incorporated
 Moton Field, Tuskegee, Alabama
 66th Flying Training Detachment
 2564th Army Air Forces Base Unit (Contract Pilot School, Primary) (Colored), April 1944
 Operated by: Tuskegee Institute
 Palmer Field, Bennettsville, South Carolina
 53d Flying Training Detachment
 Operated by: Georgia Air Service, Incorporated and Southeastern Air Service, Incorporated
 Souther Field, Americus, Georgia
 56th Flying Training Detachment
 Operated by: Graham Aviation Co.
 Taylor Field, Ocala, Florida
 57th Flying Training Detachment
 Operated by: Greenville Aviation School
 Thompson-Robbins Field, Helena, Arkansas
 59th Flying Training Detachment
 Operated by: Helena Aerotech
 Van de Graaff Field, Tuscaloosa, Alabama
 51st Flying Training Detachment
 Operated by: Alabama Institute of Aeronautics, Inc
 Woodward Field, Camden, South Carolina
 64th Flying Training Detachment
 Operated by: Southern Aviation School

 Glider Training Schools

 Antigo Airport, Antigo, Wisconsin
 14th Glider Training Detachment
 Pre-Glider/Primary Training School
 Operated by: Anderson Air Activities
 Bates Field, Mobile Alabama
 18th Glider Training Detachment
 Basic Glider Training School
 Operated by: Mobile Area Soaring Corp.
 Greenville Municipal Airport, Greenville, South Carolina
 48th Glider Training Detachment
 Elementary/Advanced Training School
 Operated by: Southern Airways, Inc.
 Grand Forks Airport, Grand Forks, North Dakota
 24th Glider Training Detachment
 Pre-Glider/Primary Training School
 Operated by: Jolly Flying Service

 Kirkwood Field, Crookston, Minnesota
 33D Glider Training Detachment
 Pre-Glider/Primary Training School
 Operated by: L. Millar-Wittig
 Lobb Field, Rochester, Minnesota
 32d Glider Training Detachment
 Pre-Glider/Primary Training School
 Operated by: Fontana School of Aeronautics
 Stillwater Airport, Stillwater, Minnesota
 34th Glider Training Detachment
 Pre-Glider/Primary Training School
 Operated by: North Aviation Company
 Monticello Field, Monticello, Minnesota
 35th Glider Training Detachment
 Pre-Glider/Primary Training School
 Operated by: Hinck Flying Service, Inc.

Central Flying Training Command
31st Flying Training Wing

 Arledge Field, Stamford, Texas
 308th Flying Training Detachment
 Operated by: Stamford Flying School and Lou Foote Flying Service and Coleman Flying School
 Avenger Field, Sweetwater, Texas
 319th Flying Training Detachment
 2563d Army Air Forces Base Unit (Women Air Service Pilots), April 1944
 Operated by: Aviation Enterprises.  Conducted Primary, Basic and Advanced (WASP) training 
 Bruce Field, Ballinger, Texas
 306th Flying Training Detachment
 Operated by: Fred Harmon Flying School
 Chickasha Municipal Airport, Chickasha, Oklahoma
 316th Flying Training Detachment
 2549th Army Air Forces Base Unit (Contract Pilot School, Primary), April 1944
 Operated by: Wilson-Bonfils Flying School 
 Cimarron Field, Oklahoma City, Oklahoma
 310th Flying Training Detachment
 Operated by: Oklahoma Air College
 Coleman Municipal Airport, Coleman, Texas
 304th Flying Training Detachment
 Operated by: Coleman FLying School, Limited
 Corsicana Field, Corsicana, Texas
 301st Flying Training Detachment
 Operated by: Air Activities of Texas
 Cuero Municipal Airport, Cuero, Texas
 303d Flying Training Detachment
 Operated by: Brayton Flying Services, Inc.
 Fort Stockton Field, Fort Stockton, Texas
 313th Flying Training Detachment
 Operated by: Pacific Air School Limited
 Garner Field, Uvalde, Texas
 305th Flying Training Detachment
 2566th Army Air Forces Base Unit (Contract Pilot School, Primary), April 1944
 Operated by: Hangar Six, Incorporated
 Grider Field, Pine Bluff, Arkansas
 312th Flying Training Detachment
 Operated by: Pine Bluff School of Aviation

 Harvey Parks Airport, Sikeston, Missouri
 311th Flying Training Detachment
 Operated by: Missouri Institute of Aeronautics
 Hatbox Field, Muskogee, Oklahoma
 315th Flying Training Detachment
 Operated by Spartan Aircraft Company and Spartan School of Aeronautics
 Hicks Field, Fort Worth, Texas
 307th Flying Training Detachment
 Operated by: Texas Aviation School and W. F. Long Flying School.
 Jones Field, Bonham, Texas
 302d Flying Training Detachment
 Operated by: Bonham Aviation School 
 Miami Municipal Airport, Miami, Oklahoma
 322d Flying Training Detachment
 Operated by: Spartan School of Aeronautics 
 Mustang Field, El Reno, Oklahoma
 320th Flying Training Detachment
 Operated by: Midwest Air School 
 Parks Metropolitan Airport, East St. Louis, Illinois
 309th Flying Training Detachment
 Operated by: Parks Air College 
 Ponca City Municipal Airport, Ponca City, Oklahoma
 323d Flying Training Detachment
 Operated by: Darr School of Aeronautics 
 Terrell Municipal Airport, Terrell, Texas
 321st Flying Training Detachment
 Operated by: Terell Aviation School, Limited 
 Tulsa Municipal Airport, Tulsa, Oklahoma
 314th Flying Training Detachment
 Operated by: Spartan School of Aeronautics 
 Victory Field, Vernon, Texas
 317th Flying Training Detachment
 Operated by: Hunter Flying Service and Richey Flying Service.

 Glider Training Schools

 Aberdeen Regional Airport, Aberdeen, South Dakota
 26th Glider Training Detachment
 Pre-Glider/Primary Training School
 Operated by: Anderson & Brennan Flying Service
 Eberts Field, Lonoke, Arkansas
 15th Glider Training Detachment
 Pre-Glider/Primary Training School
 Operated by:  Kenneth Starnes Flying Service
 Renner Field, Goodland, Kansas
 22d Glider Training Detachment
 Pre-Glider/Primary Training School
 Operated by: William A. Ong
 Hale County Airport, Plainview, Texas
 4th Glider Training Detachment
 Pre-Glider/Primary Training School
 Operated by: Clint Breedlove Aerial Service
 Hartlee Field Airport, Denton, Texas
 17th Glider Training Detachment
 Basic Glider Training School
 Operated by: Harte Flying Service
 Hays Airport, Hays, Kansas
 19th Glider Training Detachment
 Pre-Glider/Primary Training School
 Operated by: Morey Airplane Company

 Janesville Field, Janesville, Wisconsin
 16th Glider Training Detachment
 Pre-Glider/Primary Training School
 Operated by: Bonham Aviation School
 Okmulgee Municipal Airport, Okmulgee, Oklahoma
 25th Glider Training Detachment
 Pre-Glider/Primary Training School
 Operated by: Sooner Air Training Corp.
 Pittsburg Airport, Pittsburg, Kansas
 21st Glider Training Detachment
 Pre-Glider/Primary Training School
 Operated by: McFarland Flying Service 
 Spencer Municipal Airport, Spencer, Iowa
 23d Glider Training Detachment
 Pre-Glider/Primary Training School
 Operated by: Hunter Flying Service
 Hunter Flying Service moved from Spencer, Iowa, to Hamilton Airport at Hamilton, Texas, on 20 October 1942.
 Theldor Airfield, Vinita, Oklahoma
 27th Glider Training Detachment
 Pre-Glider/Primary Training School
 Operated by: Burke Aviation Service

Western Flying Training Command
36th Flying Training Wing

 Dos Palos Airport, Firebaugh/Dos Palos, California
 13th Flying Training Detachment
 Operated by: Coast Aviation Corporation
 Falcon Field, Mesa, Arizona
 15th Flying Training Detachment
 3044th Army Air Forces Base Unit (Contract Pilot School, Primary), April 1944
 Southwest Airways Co
 Gary Field, Riverside, California
 10th Flying Training Detachment
 Operated by: Morton Mfg. Company/Morton Air Academy
 Grand Central Airport, Glendale, California
 9th Flying Training Detachment
 Operated by: Cal-Aero Academy
 Lone Pine Airport, Lone Pine, California
 16th Flying Training Detachment
 Operated by: Lone Pine Academy 
 Ontario Army Airfield, Ontario, California
 7th Flying Training Detachment
 Operated by: Cal-Aero Academy
 Oxnard Army Airfield, Oxnard, California
 14th Flying Training Detachment
 3043d Army Air Forces Base Unit (Contract Pilot School, Primary), April 1944
 Operated by: Mira Loma Flight Academy
 Palo Alto Airport, King City, California
 3d Flying Training Detachment
 Operated by: Palo Alto School of Aviation Airport

 Rankin Field, Tulare, California
 4th Flying Training Detachment
 3050th Army Air Forces Base Unit (Contract Pilot School, Primary), April 1944
 Operated by: Rankin Aeronautical Academy
 Ryan Airfield, Tucson, Arizona
 11th Flying Training Detachment
 Operated by: Ryan School of Aeronautics
 Sequoia Field, Visalia, California
 8th Flying Training Detachment
 Operated by: Visalia-Dinuba School of Aeronautics
 Santa Maria Army Airfield, Santa Maria, California
 1st Flying Training Detachment
 Operated by: Hancock College of Aeronautics
 Thunderbird Field No. 1, Phoenix, Arizona
 12th Flying Training Detachment
 3040th Army Air Forces Base Unit (Contract Pilot School, Primary), April 1944
 Operated by: Southwest Airways
 Thunderbird Field No. 2, Scottsdale, Arizona
 6th Flying Training Detachment
 Operated by: Thunderbird Corporation
 Twenty Nine Palms Army Airfield, Twenty-Nine Palms, California
 17th Flying Training Detachment
 Operated by: Twenty-Nine Palms Air Academy
 War Eagle Field, Lancaster, California
 18th Flying Training Detachment
 Operated by: Polaris Flight Academy

 Glider Training Schools

 Artesia Municipal Airport, Artesia, New Mexico
 11th Glider Training Detachment
 Basic/Advanced Glider Training School
 Operated by: Big Spring Flying Service
 Big Spring Army Glider Training School, Big Spring, Texas
 28th Glider Training Detachment
 Pre-Glider/Primary Training School
 Operated by: Big Spring Flying Service
 Echeverria Field, Wickenburg, Arizona.
 Opened initially as Wickenburg Airport
 5th Glider Training Detachment
 Basic Glider Training School
 Operated by: Arizona Gliding Academy
 Converted to Primary flight training school in March 1943, re-named Echeverria Field
 20th Flying Training Detachment
 Operated by Claiborne Flight Academy

 Condor Field, Twenty-Nine Palms, California
 6th Glider Training Detachment
 Basic Glider Training School
 Operated by: Twenty-Nine Palms Air Academy
 Fort Morgan Municipal Airport, Fort Morgan, Colorado
 1st Glider Training Detachment
 Pre-Glider/Primary Training School
 Operated by: Plains Airways, Inc
 Lamesa Army Airfield, Lamesa, Texas
 29th Glider Training Detachment
 Pre-Glider/Primary Training School
 Operated by:  Clint Breedlove Aerial Service 
 Tucumcari Municipal Airport, Tucumcari, New Mexico
 9th Glider Training Detachment
 Elementary/Advanced Training School
 Operated by: Cutter-Carr Flying Service

British Flight Training Schools
Royal Air Force flying cadets used the PT-17 or PT-19; the BT-13 and AT-6 for their training in the United States.   Unlike the Army Air Forces,  RAF cadets remained at the same airfield for all three levels of their training.

 Following the attack on Pearl Harbor, The Army Air Corps determined that the schools should double from the 50 students input, to 100 students, and that 20% of :the class would be USAAC cadets.  Also, that the USAAC would take the BT-13 aircraft, and increase the PT-17's and AT-6's. Also the course would increase to 200 hours.  This was eventually adopted by the USAAF beginning in the fall of 1944.

 British Flight Training School No. 1
 321st Flying Training Detachment (31st FTW)
 2564th Army Air Forces Base Unit (Contract Pilot School Primary/Advanced), April 1944
 Terrell Municipal Airport, Texas
 Operated by:  Dallas Aviation School
 British Flight Training School No. 2
 14th Flying Training Detachment (36th FTW)
 3043d Army Air Forces Base Unit (Contract Pilot School Primary/Advanced), April 1944
 Lancaster Airport, California
 Operated by: Polaris Flight Academy
 British Flight Training School No. 3
 322d Flying Training Detachment (31st FTW)
 2565th Army Air Forces Base Unit (Contract Pilot School Primary/Advanced), April 1944
 Miami Municipal Airport, Oklahoma
 Operated by: Spartan School
 British Flight Training School No. 4
 15th Flying Training Detachment (36th FTW)
 3052d Army Air Forces Base Unit (Contract Pilot School Primary/Advanced), April 1944
 Falcon Field, Mesa, Arizona
 Operated by: Southwest Airways

 British Flight Training School No. 5
 75th Flying Training Detachment (29th FTW)
 2155th Army Air Forces Base Unit (Contract Pilot School Primary/Advanced), April 1944
 Airglades Airport, Clewiston, Florida
 Operated by: Embry-Riddle Aero School
 British Flight Training School No. 6
 323d Flying Training Detachment (31st FTW)
 2542d Army Air Forces Base Unit (Contract Pilot School Primary/Advanced), April 1944
 Ponca City Airport, Oklahoma
 Operated by: Darr School
 British Flight Training School No. 7
 318th Flying Training Detachment (31st FTW)
 Open June 16–August 18, 1942, assets dispersed afterwards
 Sweetwater Municipal Airport, Sweetwater, Texas
 Operated by: Aviation Enterprises, Ltd.
 (Last class, from #2 BFTS, Lancaster, California, transferred to Sweetwater,
 Aircraft, 51 students, and RAF Staff.  Students further displaced to
 other BFTS schools, in August, 1942.

References

USAAF Contract Flying School Airfields
Flying Training Schools of air forces